Ningzhou or Ning Prefecture was a zhou (prefecture) in imperial China centering on modern Ning County, Gansu, China. It existed from 554 to 1913.

Geography
The administrative region of Ningzhou in the Tang dynasty is in modern northeastern Gansu bordering Shaanxi. It probably includes parts of modern: 
 Under the administration of Qingyang:
Ning County
Zhengning County

References
 

Prefectures of the Sui dynasty
Prefectures of the Tang dynasty
Prefectures of the Song dynasty
Prefectures of Later Han (Five Dynasties)
Prefectures of Later Jin (Five Dynasties)
Prefectures of Later Liang (Five Dynasties)
Prefectures of Later Tang
Prefectures of Later Zhou
Prefectures of the Jin dynasty (1115–1234)
Subprefectures of the Ming dynasty
Former prefectures in Gansu